Chail is a hill station in Solan district of Himachal Pradesh, India. It is known for its salubrious beauty and virgin forests. The Chail Palace is well known for its architecture: the palace was built as summer retreat by the Maharaja of Patiala during the British Raj, on the land allotted to him by the British for former's assistance in the Anglo-Nepalese War. The cricket ground and a polo ground which is there at an altitude of 2,444 m was owned by erstwhile royal family of Patiala. It is the world's highest cricket ground.

Chail is also frequented by hikers as it offers wonderful views of the lower Himalayas. It has good trekking points from Junga, Kufri and Ashwani Khad at Solan. Many Eco camps are held here. There are many camping sites for campers and hikers, so camping in Chail is most sought after activity for enthusiasts.

History
In 1891, Maharaja Rajendra of Patiala incurred the rage of Lord Kitchener. It led to the restriction of his entry in the Indian summer capital, Shimla. This incensed the Maharaja and he vowed to build a new summer retreat for himself. So he rebuilt the place (Chail) as per his requirements.

After accession to the Indian Union, Maharaja of Patiala donated most of his buildings to Chail Military School and Government of India.

Geography
Chail is situated at an altitude of 2,250 m. The place is surrounded by the forests of chir pine and gigantic deodars. Shimla, Solan and Kasauli can also be viewed at night from here. Chail is pleasant in summers and cold in winter. Average annual rainfall is about 150 mm.

Attractions 
Rastriya Military School, Rastriya Military School Chail is one of the five Rastriya Military Schools of the country. Where approx 300 cadets from all parts of country are groomed to be the future leaders of country. 
Chail Military School, situated in ancient buildings made by Maharaja of Patiala.
Cricket Ground- Surrounded by thick forests of deodar, a well maintained Chail Cricket ground is the highest cricket ground in the world. It was built in 1893. Chail served as the summer capital of Maharaja Bhupinder Singh (who was an avid cricket lover). It is used as the school playground by Chail Military School. During school vacations it is also used as a polo ground. There is a basketball court and the same cricket ground is used for playing football as well as basketball. In one corner of the ground there is a historic tree on which the Military School has constructed a tree house.
Chail Gurudwara is also one of the main attractions of this place, it was the first building to be constructed by the Maharaja and after that the palace was built.
Chail Sanctuary(3 km)- The sanctuary was notified on 21 March 1976 near the town in district Shimla and covers an area of about 10,854.36 hectares. The Chail sanctuary has 'ghoral', 'kakkar', 'sambhar', 'red jungle fowl' and 'khalij' and 'cheer' pheasants. Machan like sighting posts have been built at Khuruin.
 Kali ka Tibba is situated at the top of a hill its also known as Kali Devi Temple. It attracts a lot of pilgrims and tourists from all across the world. 
 Lover's Point
 'Stone Kumbd' - Shiv Mandir
 Visitors can also trek approximately 10 km from Junga, (District Shimla) to Chail. Junga is approximately 10 km from Sadhupul.
Sadhupul- Sadhupul is a small village in Himachal Pradesh between Chail and Solan. It has a river restaurant near a small bridge spot constructed over the river "Ashwini". This bridge collapsed on 23 August 2014 by an overloaded truck. A New bridge has been constructed and dedicated to people in January 2018. A Water Park and Cafe at Sadhupul was opened on 30 June 2017.
The 30 km road from Chail to Kufri winds with a lot of twists and turns through the deodar forests and is very lonely and dangerous as it is just a single road, in fact all roads leading to Chail are single roads which are difficult to motor as the widths are very less and have a lot of turns. One must never drive here during night and should avoid during the day as well, no wonder that very little vehicles are found on these roads. There are many small villages on the way and eateries that serve local food and chai (Indian sweet tea).

Access 

 Roadways- Chail is well connected by road from Chandigarh, Delhi and Shimla. From Shimla via Kufri the distance is 45 km and via Kandaghat is 49 km. Kalka is 86 km from Chail. Regular buses ply between Chail and major cities like Shimla, Chandigarh and Delhi. 

 Airport- The nearest airports are at Chandigarh (120 km) and Shimla. Shimla Airport is located at Jubbarhati which is 37 km from Kandaghat. 
 Railways- Kalka-Shimla railways, the narrow gauge line is good for coming  to Chail. Toy train runs on this World Heritage Site. Nearest railway station to Chail is Kandaghat.

References

External links 
 Chalal at The Visual Yatra
 Detail Info taken from Adventure Activities at Chail
 Few More to perform at Himachal (Chail) Activities in Himachal Pradesh

Hill stations in Himachal Pradesh
Tourism in Himachal Pradesh